Ryota Tanabe (田鍋 陵太, born 10 April 1993) is a Japanese football player for Tokyo United FC.

Career statistics

Club
Updated to 31 January 2018.

References

External links

1993 births
Living people
Association football people from Tokyo
Japanese footballers
J1 League players
J2 League players
J3 League players
Nagoya Grampus players
J.League U-22 Selection players
Roasso Kumamoto players
Tokyo United FC players
Association football midfielders